Zettel may refer to:

 Zettel (Wittgenstein), a collection of remarks on philosophy
 Zettel (Liechtenauer), a collection of verses on swordfighting

People with the surname
Charlene Zettel (born 1947), American politician
Kathrin Zettel (born 1986), Austrian ski racer
Sarah Zettel (born 1966), American science fiction writer
Occupational surnames